Owen, M.D. was a BBC 1 television series that ran from 1971 to 1973. It centred around the eponymous lead character's new country practice, following his departure from The Doctors, which had been set in north London.

Two-part stories aired in the 7 p.m. slot every Wednesday and Thursday for six months, "a strange mixture of corn and ham", according to TV critic Patrick Campbell, "intended to catch the Crossroads audience that thrives on cliches and stock situations". The second series, in 1973, consisted of nine 50-minute episodes broadcast on Sunday evenings.

The theme music to the programme - "Sleepy Shores" by the Johnny Pearson Orchestra -  spent 15 weeks in the UK charts between late 1971 and early 1972, peaking at No.8. Of the run, 50 episodes have not survived, and five of the remainder only exist as monochrome Telerecordings.

Cast 
 Nigel Stock – Dr Thomas Owen 
 Joan Newell – Meg Owen
 Alan Moore - Dr. Jim Fletcher
 Maggie Hanley - Laura Hunter
 Ann Penfold -  Heather Mason

Episodes

References

External links

BBC television dramas
British medical television series
1971 British television series debuts
1973 British television series endings
1970s British drama television series